Jaroslava Pešicová (30 December 1935 – 30 August 2015) was a Czech painter and printmaker.

Pešicová was born in Prague, and studied at that city's School of Applied Arts. After graduating in 1954, she attended the Academy of Fine Arts, Prague, from which she graduated in 1960. She was married to sculptor František Štork, with whom she was a member of the group Etapa.

One print by Pešicová is in the collection of the National Gallery of Art. Her work has also appeared on postage stamps produced by the Czech Republic.

Awards 

 In 1967, she won the Odeon publishing house award at the First Prague Salon. 
 In 2003, she received the European Prize for Artistic and Cultural Activity from the European Union of the Arts. 
 In December 2017, the Czech postal service issued a stamp based on oil paintings by Pešicová. The stamp was made by engraver Václav Fajt. The cover of the first day also features overprint on the motifs of graphic design by Pešicová. Imprints and registers of stamp engravings were also issued.

References

1935 births
2015 deaths
Czech women painters
Czech printmakers
Women printmakers
20th-century Czech painters
20th-century printmakers
20th-century Czech women artists
21st-century printmakers
21st-century Czech women artists
Artists from Prague
Academy of Fine Arts, Prague alumni
People from Prague